The Women's Super-G in the 2018 FIS Alpine Skiing World Cup involved eight events, including the season final in Åre, Sweden.  Defending discipline champion Tina Weirather from Liechtenstein, daughter of 1978 and 1980 overall World Cup women's champion Hanni Wenzel and 1979 men's World Cup men's downhill discipline champion Harti Weirather, won the first race of the season and then held the lead in the discipline all season, with only two-time discipline champion Lara Gut in close pursuit until the finals.

The season was interrupted by the 2018 Winter Olympics from 12-24 February 2018 at Yongpyong Alpine Centre (slalom and giant slalom) at the Alpensia Sports Park in PyeongChang and at the Jeongseon Alpine Centre (speed events) in Jeongseon, South Korea.  The women's Super-G was held on 17 February.

Standings

DNF = Did Not Finish
DSQ = Disqualified
DNS = Did Not Start

See also
 2018 Alpine Skiing World Cup – Women's summary rankings
 2018 Alpine Skiing World Cup – Women's Overall
 2018 Alpine Skiing World Cup – Women's Downhill
 2018 Alpine Skiing World Cup – Women's Giant Slalom
 2018 Alpine Skiing World Cup – Women's Slalom
 2018 Alpine Skiing World Cup – Women's Combined

References

External links
 Alpine Skiing at FIS website

Women's Super-G
FIS Alpine Ski World Cup women's Super-G discipline titles